Metasarcidae is a family of harvestmen, first described by Adriano Kury in 1994.

Genera 
Metasarcidae contains the following seven genera:

 Ayacucho Roewer, 1949
 Huancabamba Benedetti & Pinto-da-Rocha, 2022
 Incasarcus Kury & Maury, 1998
 Lumieria Benedetti & Pinto-da-Rocha, 2022
 Metasarcus Roewer, 1913
 Tripilatus Roewer, 1932
 Tschaidicancha Roewer, 1957

References 

Harvestmen
Arachnid families